Kampinmalmi is a district in southern Helsinki, Finland. It consists of five neighbourhoods: Etu-Töölö, Lapinlahti, Kamppi, Ruoholahti and Jätkäsaari.

Kampinmalmi is located east from Lauttasaari and south from Taka-Töölö. East from Kampinmalmi is Kluuvi, and south is Punavuori.  Kampinmalmi is inhabited by approx. 28,972 people and its area is 4.07 km2.
Kampinmalmi provides 42,801 jobs which is more than in any other district in Helsinki.

References

External links
Kampinmalmi in Google Maps

Districts of Helsinki